The 1932 Ohio gubernatorial election was held on November 8, 1932. Incumbent Democrat George White defeated Republican nominee David Sinton Ingalls with 52.82% of the vote.

General election

Candidates
Major party candidates
George White, Democratic
David Sinton Ingalls, Republican 

Other candidates
Joseph Sharts, Socialist
Aaron S. Watkins, Prohibition
John Marshall, Communist
William Woodhouse, Socialist Labor

Results

References

1932
Ohio
Gubernatorial